Azariah Soromon (born 1 March 1999) is a Ni-Vanuatu footballer who plays as a forward for Fijian club Suva F.C and the Vanuatu national team.

Club career
Soromon started his career in the national Teouma Academy. In 2015 he joined his hometown club Tupuji Imere. In January 2018 he moved to Nalkutan to play for them in the 2018 OFC Champions League. In September 2018, Soromon joined New Zealand Football Championship side Southern United FC. He made his league debut for the club on 26 January 2019 in a 0-0 draw with Team Wellington, coming on as an 89th minute substitute for Abdulla Al-Kasily.

National team
In 2017 Soromon was called up for the Vanuatu national football team. He made his debut on 23 November 2017, in a 1–0 loss against Estonia. He came on in the 66 minute of play for Tony Kaltack. He scored his first senior international goal on 2 December 2017 in a 2-1 victory over New Caledonia at the 2017 Pacific Mini Games.

International goals
Scores and results list Vanuatu's goal tally first.

Private life
Two family members of Azariah play for the Vanuatu women's national football team: Brenda Anis and Emilia Taravaki.

References

External links
Profile at FOX Sports

Vanuatuan footballers
Association football forwards
Vanuatu international footballers
Living people
1999 births
New Zealand Football Championship players
Southern United FC players
Vanuatu under-20 international footballers
Nalkutan F.C. players